Werner Otto (born 3 January 1929) is a German former footballer who played internationally for Saarland.

References

1929 births
Living people
Saar footballers
Association football midfielders
Saarland international footballers
1. FC Saarbrücken players